Turnout is a British crime drama film written and directed by Lee Sales. The script was also co-written by cast members Francis Pope and George Russo. The film also stars Ophelia Lovibond, Neil Maskell and Ben Drew. The film was released on 16 September 2011, although filming took place in London during the Autumn of 2010.

Synopsis
The film is set in Hoxton, East London and follows a young couple, George and Sophie. The premise of the film involves the pair saving money to go on their first holiday together. The deposit is paid, and they have two weeks left to pay the outstanding balance of £2,000. Sophie has entrusted George with her holiday savings, and is keen to settle the debt with the travel agents. The only trouble is, unbeknown to Sophie, George is flat broke. In a vain attempt to raise cash, George uses Sophie's holiday money to fund an ill-judged drug deal, which goes horribly wrong, leaving the pair in ruins.

Cast
 George Russo as George
 Ophelia Lovibond as Sophie
 Francis Pope as Frani
 Neil Maskell as Scott
 Zara Dawson as Emma
 Sonny Muslim as Chris
 Ricci Harnett as Grant
 Tony Denham as Frank
 Ben Drew as John
 Peter Ferdinando as Pottsy
 Lee Wallace as an Extra
 Mark Hills as Extra (Uncredited)
 Micky M as Extra Karaoke/Dj (Uncredited)

Reception
The film has a 30% rating on Rotten Tomatoes, receiving more 'Rotten' reviews than 'Fresh'. Many reviews claimed that the film's storyline let it down, rather than the quality of the acting.

External links
  official website

References

2011 films
British drama films
British crime drama films
Films about drugs
Films set in London
Films shot in London
2011 directorial debut films
2010s English-language films
2010s British films